Khiddirpur railway station is a Kolkata Suburban Railway station located in Kidderpore,  Kolkata, West Bengal, India. It serves local areas of Kidderpore, Watgunge, Ekbalpur and the Calcutta Dockyard areas in Kolkata district. Only a few local trains halt here. The station has only a single platform. It's station code is KIRP.

Station complex
The platform is very much well sheltered. The station possesses many facilities including water and sanitation. It is well connected to the Dock Eastern Boundary Road in Kidderpore. There is a proper approach road to this station.

Station layout

Track Layout

See also

References

External links
 

Sealdah railway division
Railway stations in Kolkata
Transport in Kolkata
Kolkata Suburban Railway stations
Kolkata Circular Railway